Athirathram is a 1984 Indian Malayalam-language action thriller film directed by I. V. Sasi, written by John Paul and starring Mammootty, Mohanlal, and Seema. Mammootty's character Tharadas re-appears in Sasi's 2006 film Balram vs. Tharadas.

Athirathram was one of the films that elevated the leading actor Mammootty to a major star status.

Plot
Tharadas is a ruthless smuggler whose uncle was murdered by Rajesh. Rajesh is married to Thulasi who has a dark past with Tharadas. Tharadas's cousin kills Rajesh and accuses Tharadas of the murder. Rajesh's partner Prasad and Thulasi get revenge on Tharadas, and Tharadas kills Chandru in turn.

Cast

 Mammootty as Tharadas
 Mohanlal as Prasad 
 Seema as Thulasi
 Shankar as  Abu
 Ravindran as Chandru
 Lalu Alex as Charley
 Manik Irani as Goon
 Captain Raju as Rajesh
 K. P. Ummer as Thara Shankar
 Jalaja as Seetha
 Maniyanpilla Raju as Anthony
 Achankunju as Hydru
 Kundara Johnny
 Sukumari as Kathamma
 Adoor Bhasi as Lona
 Kunchan as Radhakrishnan
 Meena as Annamma

Box office
The film was an industry hit.

Soundtrack
The music was composed by M. S. Viswanathan and the lyrics were written by Kavalam Narayana Panicker.

References

External links
 

1980s Malayalam-language films
1980s crime action films
1984 films
Indian crime action films
Indian action thriller films
Indian gangster films
Films scored by M. S. Viswanathan
Films directed by I. V. Sasi